Also known as 'tsotsi taal' or 'township talk', scamto is a new youth language that has formed in South Africa. Spoken usually only by the youth, scamto comprises a mix of many languages. Some of the languages include Afrikaans, Sotho, Zulu, English and Xhosa. South Africa's large cultural melting pot is the cause of this informal language, because with every new day South Africans are finding different ways in which to interact with each other on different levels. 2 Scamto Dictionaries have been written and published by author, Lebo Motshegoa. The first book was published in 2002 under a title, Scamto Dictionary. The second offering was published in 2005, titled, Township Talk.

Here are some examples of scamto:

Mashesha - right now, or let get there now.

Jigga jigga - movement in terms of dancing, or fornication.

Entlik - prefix to pose a question, as in: "Entlik, what's the time?"

Amajita - the boys, the chaps

Askies - sorry 

Blind - exciting/embarrassing

Blesser - Sugar daddy (Usually for Sexual relations only)

But-Bae - Sugar daddy or Blesser

Cheese boy - Spoilt Brat 

Ekse - used as in: "I say, where are we?" or "Waar is ons ekse?"

G-string - BMW (because of the look of the front grill)

Groot man - Older Man (This is normally used as a sign of respect to someone older than you)

Harambe - to unite

Hadie - an apology, sorry

Last dish - supper

Lova - unemployed person

Loxion - township

Pantsula - dance movement inspired by Sophiatown.

Peena - unlock/open, used as in "Peena this car man!"

Pluck - bravery

Reverse - a woman's behind

Scufftin - Lunchbox

Waai - let's cruise, as in: "Come now, let's waai my friend."

Zozo - shack/hut in township

Languages of South Africa
African Urban Youth Languages